Simon Maginn (born 1961 in Wallasey, Merseyside) is a British writer who has written five novels under his own name: Sheep (Corgi 1994), Virgins and Martyrs (Corgi, 1995), A Sickness of the Soul (Corgi 1995), Methods of Confinement (Black Swan 1996) and Rattus (Pendragon Press 2010). The last of these was published alongside a novella by Gary Fry entitled The Invisible Architect of Psychopathy. Maginn's novels are horror/psychological thrillers. A film version of Sheep was released as The Dark in 2005.

Maginn's satirical comedies were published under the pseudonym Simon Nolan: As Good as it Gets (Quartet Books, 1999), The Vending Machine of Justice (Quartet Books, 2001) and Whitehawk (Revenge Ink, 2010). In 1993, Maginn was one of six authors chosen by W. H. Smith for a campaign involving a purchase of 20,000 paperback books. At the time, Maginn was a music teacher.

In 2018, Maginn was involved in an online clash with J. K. Rowling over tweets criticising accusations of antisemitism in the Labour Party.

References

1961 births
Living people
20th-century British novelists
21st-century British novelists
British male novelists
20th-century British male writers
21st-century British male writers